The Institute for the Encouragement of Scientific Research and Innovation of Brussels or ISRIB (French: Institut d'Encouragement de la Recherche Scientifique et de l'Innovation de Bruxelles – IRSIB, Dutch: Instituut ter bevordering van het Wetenschappelijk Onderzoek en de Innovatie van Brussel – IWOIB) promotes scientific research and technological innovation in the Brussels-Capital Region of Belgium within companies, universities and higher education institutes within the region. It provides support to both profit-oriented research and non-profit-oriented-research.

History
The ISRIB was founded by the Brussels decree of 26 June 2003, and it started its activities on 1 July 2004.

See also
 Science and technology in the Brussels-Capital Region

Sources
 The Belgian portal for research and innovation

External links
 ISRIB 

Think tanks established in 2003
2003 establishments in Belgium
Science and technology think tanks
Think tanks based in Belgium
Buildings and structures in Brussels
Research institutes in Belgium
Education in Brussels